Aileen Carol Wuornos (born Pittman; February 29, 1956 – October 9, 2002) was an American serial killer. In 1989–1990, while engaging in street prostitution along highways in Florida, she shot dead and robbed seven of her male clients. Wuornos claimed that her clients had either raped or attempted to rape her, and that all of the homicides were committed in self-defense. Wuornos was sentenced to death for six of the murders and on October 9, 2002, after 12 years on Florida's death row, was executed by lethal injection.

In the feature film Monster (2003), Wuornos' story is described from her first murder until her execution. For her portrayal of Wuornos, Charlize Theron won the Academy Award for Best Actress.

Early life
Wuornos was born Aileen Carol Pittman in Rochester, Michigan, on February 29, 1956. Her mother, Diane Wuornos (born 1939), was 14 years old when she married Aileen's father, 18-year-old Leo Dale Pittman (1936–1969), on June 3, 1954. On March 14, 1955, Diane gave birth to Aileen's older brother Keith. After less than two years of marriage, and two months before Aileen was born, Diane filed for divorce. She gave birth to Aileen at the age of 16.

Wuornos never met her father, as he was incarcerated at the time of her birth. Leo Dale Pittman was diagnosed with schizophrenia. He was later sentenced to life imprisonment for kidnapping and raping a 7-year-old girl; he committed suicide by hanging in prison on January 30, 1969. In January 1960, when Wuornos was almost four years old, Diane abandoned her children, leaving them with their maternal grandparents, Lauri and Britta Wuornos, both alcoholics, who legally adopted Keith and Aileen on March 18, 1960. 
By the age of 11, Wuornos began engaging in sexual activities in school in exchange for cigarettes, drugs, and food. She had also engaged in sexual activities with her brother. Wuornos said that her alcoholic grandfather had sexually assaulted and beaten her when she was a child. Before beating her, he would force her to strip out of her clothes. In 1970, at age 14, she became pregnant, having been raped by a friend of her grandfather.

Wuornos gave birth to a boy at a home for unwed mothers on March 23, 1971, and the child was placed for adoption. A few months after her son was born, she dropped out of school at about the same time that her grandmother died of liver failure. When Wuornos was 15, her grandfather threw her out of the house, and she began supporting herself through prostitution and living in the woods near her old home.

Early criminal activity
On May 27, 1974, at age 18, Wuornos was arrested in Jefferson County, Colorado, for driving under the influence (DUI), disorderly conduct, and firing a .22-caliber pistol from a moving vehicle. She was later charged with failure to appear.

In 1976, Wuornos hitchhiked to Florida, where she met 69-year-old yacht club president Lewis Gratz Fell. They married quickly and the announcement of their nuptials was printed in the local newspaper's society pages. Wuornos continually involved herself in confrontations at their local bar and went to jail briefly for assault. She also hit Fell with his own cane, leading him to gain a restraining order against her within weeks of the marriage. She returned to Michigan where, on July 14, 1976, she was arrested at Bernie's Club, in Mancelona, in Antrim County and charged with assault and disturbing the peace for throwing a cue ball at a bartender's head.

On July 17, her brother Keith died of esophageal cancer and Wuornos received $10,000 from his life insurance. Wuornos and Fell annulled their marriage on July 21 after only nine weeks. In August 1976, Wuornos was given a $105 fine for drunk driving. She used the money inherited from her brother to pay the fine and spent the rest within two months buying luxuries including a new car, which she wrecked shortly afterwards.

In 1978, at the age of 22, she attempted suicide by shooting herself in the stomach. Between the ages of 14 and 22, she attempted suicide six times. On May 20, 1981, Wuornos was arrested in Edgewater, Florida, for the armed robbery of a convenience store, where she stole $35 and two packs of cigarettes. She was sentenced to prison on May 4, 1982, and released on June 30, 1983. On May 1, 1984, Wuornos was arrested for attempting to pass forged checks at a bank in Key West. On November 30, 1985, she was named as a suspect in the theft of a revolver and ammunition in Pasco County.

On January 4, 1986, Wuornos was arrested in Miami and charged with car theft, resisting arrest, and obstruction of justice for providing identification bearing her aunt's name. Miami police officers found a .38-caliber revolver and a box of ammunition in the stolen car. On June 2, 1986, Volusia County deputy sheriffs detained Wuornos for questioning after a male companion accused her of pulling a gun in his car and demanding $200. Wuornos was found to be carrying spare ammunition, and police discovered a .22 pistol under the passenger seat she had occupied.

In 1986, 30-year-old Wuornos met 24-year-old Tyria Moore, a hotel maid, at a Daytona Beach gay bar called Zodiac. They moved in together, and Wuornos supported them with her earnings as a prostitute. On July 4, 1987, Daytona Beach police detained Wuornos and Moore at a bar for questioning regarding an incident in which they were accused of assault and battery with a beer bottle.

On March 12, 1988, Wuornos accused a Daytona Beach bus driver of assault. She claimed that he pushed her off the bus following a confrontation. Moore was listed as a witness to the incident. Later, at her trial, Wuornos stated: "It was love beyond imaginable. Earthly words cannot describe how I felt about Tyria." Before her execution, Wuornos claimed to still be in love with Moore.

Murders
Wuornos murdered seven men within a period of 12 months. All the men were drivers between the ages of 40 to 65. 

 Richard Charles Mallory, age 51, electronics store owner in Clearwater (date of murder: November 30, 1989). Wuornos claimed that Mallory beat, raped, and sodomized her after he drove her to an abandoned area for sexual services. Mallory was Wuornos' first victim and she claimed to have killed him in self-defense. Later, it became known that Mallory had previously been convicted for attempted rape in Maryland. Two days after the murder, a Volusia County deputy sheriff found Mallory's abandoned vehicle. On December 13, his body was found several miles away in a wooded area; he had been shot several times, and two bullets to the left lung were found to have been the cause of death.
 David Andrew Spears, age 47, construction worker in Winter Garden. He was declared missing as of May 19, 1990. On June 1, 1990, his naked body was found along U.S. Route 19 in Florida in Citrus County. He had been shot six times by a .22 pistol.
 Charles Edmund Carskaddon, age 40, part-time rodeo worker (date of murder: May 31, 1990). On June 6, 1990, his body was found in Pasco County. He had been shot nine times with a .22 caliber weapon. The body had been wrapped in an electric blanket and was badly decomposing when found. Witnesses saw Wuornos in possession of Carskaddon's car, and Wuornos had also pawned a gun identified as belonging to Carskaddon.
  Peter Abraham Siems, age 65, retired merchant seaman. In June 1990, Siems left Jupiter, Florida, for Arkansas. On July 4, 1990, his car was found in Orange Springs, Florida. Moore and Wuornos were seen abandoning the car, and Wuornos' palm print was found on the interior door handle. His body was never found.
 Troy Eugene Burress, age 50, sausage salesman from Ocala, Florida. On July 31, 1990, he was reported missing. On August 4, 1990, his body was found in a wooded area along State Road 19 in Marion County. He had been shot twice.
 Charles Richard "Dick" Humphreys, age 56, retired U.S. Air Force Major, former state child abuse investigator, and former Chief of Police (date of murder: September 11, 1990). On September 12, 1990, his body was found in Marion County. He was fully clothed and had been shot seven times in the head and torso. His car was found in Suwannee County.
 Walter Jeno Antonio, age 62, trucker, security guard, and reserve police officer. On November 19, 1990, Antonio's nearly naked body was found near a remote logging road in Dixie County. He had been shot four times. Five days later, his car was found in Brevard County.

Arrest and trial
On July 4, 1990, Wuornos and Tyria Moore abandoned victim Peter Siems' car after they were involved in an accident. Rhonda Bailey, who witnessed the accident, provided police with a description of two women, resulting in a media campaign to locate them. Police also found some of the victims' belongings in pawnshops. Wuornos' fingerprint that was found on a receipt at one of the pawnshops matched the print that was left in Siems' car. Wuornos had a criminal record in Florida, and samples of her prints were in a database.

On January 9, 1991, Wuornos was arrested on an outstanding warrant at The Last Resort biker bar in Volusia County. Police located Moore the next day in Scranton, Pennsylvania. Moore agreed to elicit a confession from Wuornos in exchange for immunity from prosecution. Moore returned with the police to Florida, where she was put up in a motel. Under police guidance, she made numerous telephone calls to Wuornos, pleading for help in clearing her name. Three days later, on January 16, 1991, Wuornos confessed to the murders. She claimed the men had tried to rape her and she killed them in self-defense. In November 1991, Wuornos was legally adopted by 44-year-old Arlene Pralle who saw her photo in a newspaper.

On January 14, 1992, Wuornos went to trial for the murder of Richard Charles Mallory. Although previous convictions are normally inadmissible in criminal trials, under Florida's Williams Rule, the prosecution was allowed to introduce evidence related to her other crimes to show a pattern of illegal activity. On January 27, 1992, Wuornos was convicted of Mallory's murder with help from Moore's testimony. At her sentencing, psychiatrists for the defense testified that Wuornos was mentally unstable and diagnosed her with borderline personality disorder and antisocial personality disorder. Four days later, she was sentenced to death.

Wuornos' defense made efforts during the trial to introduce evidence that Mallory was previously convicted for attempted rape in Maryland and served a sentence in a maximum security correctional facility providing remediation to sexual offenders. Records obtained from the correctional institution showed that from 1958 to 1962, Mallory was committed for treatment and observation resulting from a criminal charge of assault with intent to rape and received an overall eight years of treatment from the facility. In 1961, "it was observed of Mr. Mallory that he possessed strong sociopathic trends". However, the judge refused to allow the records to be admitted in court as evidence and denied Wuornos' request for a retrial.

On March 31, 1992, Wuornos pleaded no contest to the murders of Charles Richard Humphreys, Troy Eugene Burress, and David Andrew Spears, saying she wanted to "get right with God". In her statement to the court, she said, in part, "I wanted to confess to you that Richard Mallory did violently rape me as I've told you; but these others did not. [They] only began to start to." On May 15, 1992, Wuornos was given three more death sentences. In June 1992, Wuornos pleaded guilty to the murder of Charles Edmund Carskaddon. In November 1992, she received her fifth death sentence. In February 1993, Wuornos pleaded guilty to the murder of Walter Jeno Antonio and was sentenced to death again. No charges were brought against her for the murder of Peter Abraham Siems, as his body was never found. In all, Wuornos received six death sentences.

Wuornos told several inconsistent stories about the killings. She claimed initially that all seven men had raped her while she was working as a prostitute but later recanted the claim of self-defense, citing robbery and a desire to leave no witnesses as the reason for murder. During an interview with filmmaker Nick Broomfield, when Wuornos thought the cameras were off, she told him that it was, in fact, self-defense, but she could not stand being on death row—where she had been for ten years at that point—and wanted to die.

Assessed using the Psychopathy Checklist, Wuornos scored 32/40 with the cutoff score of 30 for determining psychopathy. The checklist evaluates individuals on a 20-item list of antisocial and interpersonal behaviors, with each item being scored as zero, one, or two, with a maximum score of 40.

Death row and execution

Being on death row
Wuornos was incarcerated at the Florida Department of Corrections Broward Correctional Institution (BCI) death row for women, then transferred to the Florida State Prison for execution. Her appeal to the U.S. Supreme Court was denied in 1996. In a 2001 petition to the Florida Supreme Court, she stated her intention to dismiss her legal counsel and terminate all pending appeals. "I killed those men," she wrote, "robbed them as cold as ice. And I'd do it again, too. There's no chance in keeping me alive or anything, because I'd kill again. I have hate crawling through my system...I am so sick of hearing this 'she's crazy' stuff. I've been evaluated so many times. I'm competent, sane, and I'm trying to tell the truth. I'm one who seriously hates human life and would kill again." While her attorneys argued that she was not mentally competent to make such a request, Wuornos insisted that she knew what she was doing, and a court-appointed panel of psychiatrists agreed.

In 2002, Wuornos began accusing prison matrons of tainting her food with dirt, saliva, and urine. She said she had overheard conversations among prison personnel "trying to get me so pushed over the brink by them I'd wind up committing suicide before the execution" and "wishing to rape me before execution". She also complained of strip searches, tight handcuffing, door kicking, frequent window checks, low water pressure, mildew on her mattress, and "cat calling ... in distaste and a pure hatred towards me". Wuornos threatened to boycott showers and food trays when certain officers were on duty. "In the meantime, my stomach's growling away and I'm taking showers through the sink of my cell." Her attorney stated that "Ms. Wuornos really just wants to have proper treatment, humane treatment until the day she's executed." He added, "She believes what she's written."

In the weeks before her execution, Wuornos gave a series of interviews to documentarian Nick Broomfield and talked about "being taken away to meet God and Jesus and the angels and whatever is beyond the beyond". In her final interview, she once again charged that her mind was "tortured" at BCI, and her head crushed by "sonic pressure". Food poisonings and other abuses worsened, she said, each time she complained, with the goal of making her appear insane, or to drive her insane. She also turned on her interviewer: "You sabotaged my ass! Society, and the cops, and the system! A raped woman got executed, and was used for books and movies and shit!" Her final on-camera words were "Thanks a lot, society, for railroading my ass." Dawn Botkins, a childhood friend of Wuornos, later told Broomfield that her verbal abuse was directed at society and the media in general, not at him specifically.

Execution and death
Wuornos's execution by lethal injection took place on October 9, 2002. She declined her last meal which could have been anything under $20 and opted for a cup of coffee instead. Her last words were, "Yes, I would just like to say I'm sailing with the rock, and I'll be back, like Independence Day, with Jesus. June 6, like the movie. Big mother ship and all, I'll be back, I'll be back." She died at 9:47 a.m. EDT. She was the second woman in Florida and the tenth in the United States to be executed since the 1976 United States Supreme Court decision restoring capital punishment.

After her death, Wuornos' body was cremated. Wuornos' ashes were scattered beneath a tree in her native Michigan by Wuornos' childhood friend Dawn Botkins. At Wuornos' request, Natalie Merchant's song "Carnival" from her album Tigerlily was played at her funeral: Wuornos spent many hours listening to this album on death row. When Merchant found out about this, she gave permission to use the song in the closing credits of Nick Broomfield's documentary Aileen: Life and Death of a Serial Killer:

Broomfield later speculated on Wuornos' motive and state of mind:

Psychopathology model
According to some specialists, Wuornos's crimes have been related to her psychopathic personality and her psychotraumatic past. Using the Psychopathy Checklist, Wuornos was found to have a psychopathic personality with a PCL-R score of 32 with the cutoff score for psychopathy being 30 in the United States. Wuornos was also known to meet the relevant criteria for determining both borderline personality disorder and antisocial personality disorder.

Much of Wuornos' childhood sexual abuse and career in sex work are said to have irrevocably damaged her, and it could be seen that traumatic experiences throughout most of her young life could play a part in Wuornos's psychological state, including her biological mother's departure as well as her grandmother ignoring the abuse she endured from her grandfather, thus leading to the lack of development of a mother–daughter bond for Wuornos as a young girl. The damage was then made worse because both Wuornos and her brother believed that their grandparents were their biological parents, but at the age of 11 they learned that this was not the case, which further damaged the relationship between Wuornos and her adoptive parents.

Wuornos was also known to have early behavioral problems such as having an explosive temper which limited her ability to make friends, as well as making it increasingly difficult for her to maintain relationships. Her traumatic upbringing, including her physical and sexual abuse, have been partially linked to the development of her borderline personality disorder. Such severe trauma can also disrupt the structuralization of the mind at various developmental points and result in "primitive, dissociative, and splitting defenses to ward off the intensity of emotional and sexual stimulation that cannot be integrated as a child."

FBI profiler Robert K. Ressler briefly mentions Wuornos in his autobiographical history of his 20 years with the FBI. Writing in 1992, he said he often does not discuss female serial killers because they tend to kill in sprees instead of in a sequential fashion. He noted Wuornos as the sole exception. Ressler, who allegedly coined the phrase "serial killer" to describe murderers seeking personal gratification, does not apply it to women killing in postpartum psychosis or to any murderer acting solely for financial gain, such as women who have killed a series of boarders or spouses.

In media

Books
 Reynolds, Michael (1992). Dead Ends. Warner (first publiсation of the book). .
 Russell, Sue (2002). Lethal Intent. Pinnacle Books. .
 Wuornos, Aileen; Berry-Dee, Christopher (2004). Monster: My True Story. John Blake Publishing. .
 Wuornos, Aileen (2012). Kester, Lisa; Gottlieb, Daphne (eds.). Dear Dawn: Aileen Wuornos in Her Own Words. Soft Skull Press. .

 Other works
 The poem "Sugar Zero" by Rima Banerji (appears in the 2005 Arsenal Pulp Press publication Red Light: Superheroes, Saints, and Sluts).
 The poem "Aileen Wuornos" by Doron Braunshtein (appears in his 2011 spoken word CD The Obsessive Poet).
 The book Life of the Party (2019): the poet Olivia Gatwood refers to Wuornos throughout her book.

Documentaries
Filmmaker Nick Broomfield directed two documentaries about Wuornos:

 Aileen Wuornos: The Selling of a Serial Killer (1993)
 Aileen: Life and Death of a Serial Killer (2003)

Wuornos was the subject of episodes of the documentary TV series American Justice, Biography and Deadly Women. She was also featured in an episode of the TV series The New Detectives (season 3, episode 1: "Fatal Compulsion").

An episode of Murder Made Me Famous on the Reelz television network, airing December 1, 2018, chronicled the case. In February 2020, the series Very Scary People was shown on the Crime & Investigation; episodes 3 and 4 describes how the investigation into Wuornos was conducted. A 2021 episode of Catching Killers from Netflix is centered around Wuornos: the 40-minute episode is titled, "Manhunter: Aileen Wuornos."

Films
The biographical drama film Monster (2003), written and directed by Patty Jenkins, stars Charlize Theron as Wuornos and Christina Ricci as Tyria Moore (named Selby Wall in the film). It chronicles Wuornos' life and her relationship with her girlfriend, Moore, who testified against Wuornos. Theron won the Academy Award for Best Actress for her performance in the film.

The horror-thriller film Aileen Wuornos: American Boogeywoman which shows a fictional version of the early life of Wuornos, was released as Video-on-demand on October 8, 2021, and on DVD on October 15, 2021. It stars Peyton List as Wuornos.

Television
The TV movie Overkill: The Aileen Wuornos Story (1992) starred Jean Smart as Wuornos. The antagonist of the 2002 Law & Order: Special Victims Unit episode "Chameleon" — Maggie Peterson (Sharon Lawrence), a prostitute who murders her johns — is based on Wuornos.

In 2015, Lily Rabe portrayed a fictionalized version of Wuornos as part of a Halloween storyline in American Horror Story: Hotel in the fourth episode of the show's fifth season, and later in the season finale.

Music
An operatic adaptation of Wuornos' life premiered at San Francisco, California's Yerba Buena Center for the Arts on June 22, 2001. Entitled Wuornos, the opera was written by composer/librettist Carla Lucero, conducted by Mary Chun, and produced by the Jon Sims Center for the Performing Arts.

Several musicians have written songs about Wuornos, including Jewel ("Nicotine Love"), the New York-based metalcore band It Dies Today ("Sixth of June"), and Pablo Hasél ("Inéditas por culpa de Aileen Wuornos").

The singer Diamanda Galás recorded a live cover of the Phil Ochs song "Iron Lady", which she would often perform as a tribute to Wuornos, for her performance album Malediction and Prayer.

Japanese doom metal band Church of Misery released the song "Filth Bitch Boogie (Aileen Wuornos)" on their 2004 studio album The Second Coming.

Samples of interviews with Wuornos feature prominently throughout Dragged into Sunlight's 2009 album Hatred for Mankind, and Lingua Ignota's 2017 album All Bitches Die at the beginning of the songs "For I Am the Light (and Mine is the Only Way)" and "Holy is the Name (Of My Ruthless Axe)". Lingua Ignota's song 	"If the Poison Won't Take You My Dogs Will" of her 2018 album Caligula is also about Wuornos.

The song "Poor Aileen" by Superheaven, which is the final track from the 2015 album Ours Is Chrome, is written about Aileen Wuornos.

A parody cover version of Dolly Parton's song "Jolene" called "Aileen", dedicated by Wuornos, is featured on Willam Belli's third album. The music video, featuring Gigi Gorgeous portraying Wuornos, was released on November 1, 2018.

In 2019, rapper Cardi B recreated Wuornos' famous mugshot for her single "Press". In 2020, rapper Sadistik released the song "Aileen Wuornos", dedicated to the serial killer, on his Delirium EP.

See also
 Capital punishment in Florida
 Capital punishment in the United States
 List of people executed in Florida
 List of people executed in the United States in 2002
 List of serial killers by number of victims
 List of serial killers in the United States
 List of women executed in the United States since 1976

References

Cited sources

External links

 Aileen Wuornos at 
 

1956 births
2002 deaths
1989 murders in the United States
1990 murders in the United States
20th-century American criminals
21st-century executions by Florida
21st-century executions of American people
American female serial killers
American prostitutes
American adoptees
American people convicted of robbery
American people of Finnish descent
American people of English descent
Criminals from Florida
Executed American female serial killers
Executed people from Michigan
LGBT people from Florida
LGBT people from Michigan
LGBT prostitutes
People convicted of murder by Florida
People executed by Florida by lethal injection
People from Rochester, Michigan
People with antisocial personality disorder
People with borderline personality disorder
Violence against men in North America
Violence against women in the United States